Gbenko Airport  is an airstrip serving Banankoro in Guinea.

The Gbenko non-directional beacon (Ident: GK) is located on the field.

See also

Transport in Guinea
List of airports in Guinea

References

External links
OpenStreetMap - Gbenko Airport
 OurAirports - Gbenko Airport
 
 Gbenko Airport
 Google Earth

Airports in Guinea